10th SLGFCA Awards
December 14, 2013

Best Film: 
12 Years a Slave

Best Director: 
Steve McQueen12 Years a Slave
The nominees for the 10th St. Louis Film Critics Association Awards were announced on December 9, 2013.

Winners, runners-up and nominees

Best Film
 12 Years a Slave
 Runner-up: American Hustle
 Gravity
 Her
 Nebraska

Best Actor
 Chiwetel Ejiofor – 12 Years a Slave
 Runner-up: Matthew McConaughey – Dallas Buyers Club
 Christian Bale – American Hustle
 Bruce Dern – Nebraska
 Michael B. Jordan – Fruitvale Station

Best Supporting Actor
 Jared Leto – Dallas Buyers Club
 Runner-up: Will Forte – Nebraska
 Barkhad Abdi – Captain Phillips
 Michael Fassbender – 12 Years a Slave
 Harrison Ford – 42

Best Original Screenplay
 Her – Spike Jonze Runner-up: American Hustle – David O. Russell and Eric Warren Singer Enough Said – Nicole Holofcener
 Nebraska – Bob Nelson
 Saving Mr. Banks – Kelly Marcel and Sue Smith

Best Cinematography
 12 Years a Slave – Sean Bobbitt Runner-up: Gravity – Emmanuel Lubezki The Grandmaster – Philippe Le Sourd
 The Great Gatsby – Simon Duggan
 Inside Llewyn Davis – Bruno Delbonnel
 Nebraska – Phedon Papamichael

Best Music
 Arcade Fire - Her
 Runner-up (tie): Steven Price - Gravity and Mark Orton - Nebraska
 Hans Zimmer - 12 Years a Slave 
 Howard Shore - The Hobbit: The Desolation of Smaug
 Thomas Newman - Saving Mr. Banks

Best Art Direction
 The Great Gatsby
 Runner-up: Her
 12 Years a Slave
 The Grandmaster
 Inside Llewyn Davis

Best Foreign Language Film
 Blue Is the Warmest Colour • France Runner-up Wadjda • Saudi Arabia / Germany A Hijacking • Denmark
 The Hunt • Denmark
 No • Chile

Best Animated Feature
 Frozen
 Runner-up: The Wind Rises
 The Croods
 Despicable Me 2
 Monsters University

Best Scene
(favorite movie scene or sequence)
 12 Years a Slave: The hanging scene Runner-up: Gravity: Opening tracking shot Captain Phillips: The scene near the end of the film where Tom Hanks is being checked out by military medical personnel and he breaks down.
 Her: OS sex scene
 The Place Beyond the Pines: The opening scene where Ryan Gosling is walking through the carnival.

Best Director
 Steve McQueen – 12 Years a Slave
 Runner-up: Alfonso Cuarón – Gravity
 Spike Jonze – Her
 Alexander Payne – Nebraska
 David O. Russell – American Hustle

Best Actress
 Cate Blanchett – Blue Jasmine
 Runner-up: Meryl Streep – August: Osage County
 Amy Adams – American Hustle
 Sandra Bullock – Gravity
 Judi Dench – Philomena
 Emma Thompson – Saving Mr. Banks

Best Supporting Actress
 Lupita Nyong'o – 12 Years a Slave
 Runner-up: June Squibb – Nebraska
 Scarlett Johansson – Her
 Jennifer Lawrence – American Hustle
 Léa Seydoux – Blue Is the Warmest Colour

Best Adapted Screenplay
 12 Years a Slave – John Ridley Runner-up: Philomena – Steve Coogan and Jeff Pope Before Midnight – Julie Delpy, Ethan Hawke and Richard Linklater
 Captain Phillips – Billy Ray
 Short Term 12 – Destin Daniel Cretton
 The Spectacular Now – Scott Neustadter and Michael H. Weber

Best Visual Effects
 Gravity
 Runner-up: The Hobbit: The Desolation of Smaug
 Iron Man 3
 Pacific Rim
 Star Trek Into Darkness
 Thor: The Dark World

Best Soundtrack
 Inside Llewyn Davis
 Runner-up: Frozen
 American Hustle
 Despicable Me 2
 The Great Gatsby
 Muscle Shoals

Best Documentary Film
 Blackfish
 Runner-up (tie): The Act of Killing and Stories We Tell
 20 Feet from Stardom
 Muscle Shoals

Best Comedy
 Enough Said and The World's End (tie)
The Heat
Nebraska
The Way, Way Back

Best Art-House or Festival Film
 Short Term 12
 Runner-up (tie): Blue Is the Warmest Colour and Frances Ha
 Ain't Them Bodies Saints
 Before Midnight
 In a World...

Multiple nominations and awards

These films had multiple nominations:
10 nominations: 12 Years a Slave 
9 nominations: Nebraska
7 nominations: American Hustle, Gravity, and Her
3 nominations: Blue is the Warmest Color, Captain Phillips, The Great Gatsby, Inside Llewyn Davis, and Saving Mr. Banks
2 nominations: Before Midnight, Dallas Buyers Club, Despicable Me 2, Enough Said, Frozen, The Grandmaster, The Hobbit: The Desolation of Smaug, Philomena, and Short Term 12

References

External links
 Official website

2013
2013 film awards
2013 in Missouri
St Louis